The Dutch Women's Water Polo Championship is the premier championship for women's water polo clubs in the Netherlands. First held in 1920, it is currently contested by twelve teams. As of 2012 it is granted one spot in the Champions' Cup and two in the LEN Trophy.

2011-12 teams
  ZPC Barendrecht
  BZC Brandenburg
  GZC Donk
  ZPC De Gouwe
  ZV Haarlem
  ZV De Ham
  ZPC Het Ravijn
  ZVL Leiden
  ZWV Nereus
  EZC Polar Bears
  PSV Eindhoven
  UZSC Utrecht

Champions
  HZC De Robben (29)
 1946, 1947, 1949, 1950, 1951, 1952, 1953, 1954, 1955, 1956, 1957, 1958, 1959, 1960, 1961, 1962, 1963, 1964, 1965, 1966, 1967, 1968, 1969, 1970, 1971, 1972, 1973, 1974, 1975
  HZ Zian (11)
 1928, 1929, 1930, 1931, 1935, 1936, 1937, 1939, 1940, 1941, 1943
  GZC Donk (9)
 1985, 1987, 1988, 1990, 1992, 1998, 1999, 2005, 2011
  HDZ Amsterdam (8)
 1920, 1921, 1922, 1923, 1926, 1927, 1933, 1934
  ZWV Nereus (7)
 1989, 1993, 1994, 1995, 1996, 1997, 2001
  ZPC De Otters Het Gooi (6)
 1979, 1980, 1981, 1982, 1983, 1984
  Polar Bears Ede (5)
 2002, 2004, 2007, 2009, 2010
  ZPC Het Ravijn (4)
 2000, 2003, 2008, 2012
  RDZ Rotterdam (3)
 1924, 1925, 1932
  DSZ Den Haag (3)
 1976, 1977, 1978
  BZC Brandenburg (2)
 1991, 2006
  ADZ Amsterdam (1)
 1938
  UZSC Utrecht (1)
 1942
  ZC De Vuursche (1)
 1986

References

 

Championships
Neth
Water polo competitions in the Netherlands
waterpolo
Recurring sporting events established in 1920
1920 establishments in the Netherlands